James Hastie (1892 – 14 December 1914) was a Scottish professional footballer who played as a right back in the Scottish Football League for St. Bernard's.

Personal life
Hastie worked in an electrical power station in Edinburgh. Prior to the First World War, he served in the King's Own Scottish Borderers as a territorial. After the outbreak of the war, Hastie enlisted as a private in the Gordon Highlanders in Aberdeen, and was killed in action in West Flanders on 14 December 1914. He is commemorated on the Menin Gate.

Career statistics

References

1892 births
Date of birth missing
1914 deaths
People from Berwickshire
Sportspeople from the Scottish Borders
Scottish footballers
Association football fullbacks
Scottish Football League players
Selkirk F.C. players
Stockport County F.C. players
St Bernard's F.C. players
King's Own Scottish Borderers soldiers
Gordon Highlanders soldiers
British Army personnel of World War I
British military personnel killed in World War I